The Sherbrooke Phoenix is a major junior ice hockey team based in Sherbrooke, Quebec, Canada, that plays in the Quebec Major Junior Hockey League (QMJHL). The team plays its home games at the Palais des Sports Léopold-Drolet.

History
The franchise was granted as a replacement for the Lewiston Maineiacs, which folded at the end of the 2010–11 QMJHL season.
On May 31, 2011, the Quebec Major Junior Hockey League held a conference call to prepare an offer to purchase the team from Mark Just for 3.5 million dollars. The dissolved Maineiacs franchise were the Sherbrooke Castors prior to relocating to Lewiston, Maine, prior to the start of the 2003–04 QMJHL season. The Phoenix marks the city's third attempt at a QMJHL franchise. On May 22, 2012, the Phoenix named former Champlain College Cougars head coach Judes Vallée the franchise's first head coach.

The Phoenix made their inaugural draft selection in the QMJHL Bantam Draft, selecting Daniel Audette with the franchise's first-ever draft pick. Audette is the son of former Buffalo Sabres forward Donald Audette. The Phoenix filled out their roster in an expansion draft. The Phoenix played the franchise's inaugural game against the Victoriaville Tigres on September 7, 2012, defeating the Tigres 4-2 in Victoriaville. Jeremie Beaudry scored the franchise's first regular season goal, while Daniel Audette recorded the first regular season assist. Beaudry's stay in Sherbrooke was, however, short-lived, as he was traded to the Quebec Remparts three months later. On January 13, 2013, the Phoenix recorded the franchise's first-ever shutout against the two-time league champion Saint John Sea Dogs. The Phoenix finished their inaugural season with a 21-38-3-6 record, which was good enough for 15th place in the QMJHL, which allowed them to make the playoffs for the first time. The excitement, however, was short-lived, as the team was swept out in the first round by the second-seeded Baie-Comeau Drakkar, being outscored 27-7 in the series. Michael McNamee scored the Phoenix franchise's first-ever playoff goal, while Brandon Lesway and Denis Kamaev recorded the first playoff assists in franchise history.

Team results
Note: GP = Games played, W = Wins, L = Losses, OTL = Overtime losses, SL = Shootout Losses, Pts = Points, GF = Goals for, GA = Goals against, PIM = Penalties in minutes, Finish = Finish in Division, Playoffs = Results in playoffs

NHL alumni
Maxime Lagacé
Mathieu Olivier
Jeffrey Viel

References

Quebec Major Junior Hockey League teams
Ice hockey teams in Quebec
Sport in Sherbrooke
Ice hockey clubs established in 2012
2012 establishments in Quebec